An eye is an organ of vision.

3YE, Eye, The Eye or EYE may also refer to:

People
 Ay (pharaoh), also spelled Eye (fl. c. 1327–1319), the penultimate pharaoh of ancient Egypt's 18th dynasty
 Eye-D (born 1974), a Dutch drum & bass producer and DJ based in Goes, the Netherlands
 Jessica Eye, an American mixed martial artist
 Yamantaka Eye (born 1964), a Japanese musician and artist

Places

England
 Eye, Cambridgeshire, a village in Peterborough
 Eye, Herefordshire
 Eye, Suffolk
 Eye (UK Parliament constituency)
 Eia, also known as Eye, a former medieval manor that is now part of Central London
 Eye Brook, Rutland
 Eye Green, Peterborough
 River Eye, Gloucestershire
 River Eye, Leicestershire

Scotland
 Eye Peninsula
 Eye Water, a river

United States
 Eye, West Virginia, an unincorporated community

Art, entertainment, and media

Fictional entities
 Brother Eye, a DC Comics character who is part of the OMAC Project
 Eye (Centaur Publications), a giant, floating disembodied eye, in a halo of golden light
 The Eye of Sauron, a form taken by Sauron in The Lord of the Rings

Film
 The Eye (2002 film), a Hong Kong horror film
 The Eye 2, a 2004 sequel film
 The Eye 10 or The Eye 3 or The Eye Infinity, a 2005 sequel film
 The Eye 3D or The Child's Eye, a 2010 sequel film
 The Eye (2008 film), an American remake starring Jessica Alba

Games 
 E.Y.E.: Divine Cybermancy, a 2011 video game
 Eyes, a key concept in the game of Go
 PlayStation Eye, an EyeToy like peripheral for the PlayStation 3
 Queen: The eYe, a 1998 video game featuring music by the rock group Queen

Literature
 Eye (short story collection), a 1985 Frank Herbert short story collection
 The Eye of the World
 The Eye (novel), a 1930 novel by Vladimir Nabokov

Music

Albums
 Eye (Robyn Hitchcock album), by Robyn Hitchcock
 Eye (Sekai no Owari album), by Sekai no Owari
 The Eye (King Diamond album), a 1990 heavy metal concept album
 The Eye (KUKL album), a 1984 post-punk album
 The Eye (Yello album), a 2003 electronica album

Songs
 "Eye" (song), by the Smashing Pumpkins; featured on the Lost Highway soundtrack
 "Eye", a song by Madvillain from his album Madvillainy
 "Eye", a song by Neurosis from their album Through Silver in Blood
 "Eye", a song by Pitchshifter from their album Industrial
 "The 'Eye", a song by Squarepusher from his album Selection Sixteen (note the apostrophe)

Periodicals
 Eye (journal), a scientific journal published by the Royal College of Ophthalmologists
 Eye (magazine), the International Review of Graphic Design
 Eye Weekly, a Toronto-based publication
 Eye Magazine, published by the Hearst Corporation, 1968–69, with articles on youth culture

Radio
 The Eye (radio station), a community radio station in England

Television
 "The Eye" (Stargate Atlantis), a 2004 episode
 "The Eye" (The Brak Show), a 2001 episode
 "The Eye" (The Lord of the Rings: The Rings of Power), a 2022 episode

Enterprises and organizations
CBS Broadcasting Inc., nicknamed "The Eye" based on the network's logo
 EYE Film Institute Netherlands
 The eye logo used for the Brazilian television network Band.

Religion
 Eye of Horus, an Egyptian symbol related to the deity Horus
 Eye of Ra, a being in Egyptian mythology
 Third eye, a mystical or esoteric concept

Other uses
 Eye (cyclone), the center of a tropical cyclone
 Eye pattern, also known as an eye diagram, an oscilloscope display of a digital data signal
 Eye of Providence, a symbol depicting an eye within a triangle
 London Eye, an observation wheel and tourist attraction
 Tianjin Binhai Library, also known as "The Eye", Tianjin, China
 European Youth Event, an event in European Parliament
 The loop of an eye bolt
 The result of an eye splice
 An identity matrix
Eyes (cheese), round holes in cheese
3YE, South Korean girl group

See also
 AY (disambiguation)
 Aye (disambiguation)
 Eyes (disambiguation)
 I (disambiguation)